During the 1954–55 English football season, Brentford competed in the Football League Third Division South. In the club's first season back in the third-tier since 1932–33, the Bees finished in mid-table. The season was memorable for the debuts of youth products Jim Towers and George Francis, who went on to dominate Brentford's goalscoring charts until 1961.

Season summary 
The 1954–55 Third Division South season marked Brentford's fall from the top-flight to the basement in just seven years. It was the Bees' first Third Division South season since 1932–33 and though he had a limited budget, manager Bill Dodgin Sr. did not conduct a fire sale and managed to keep his squad intact. Forwards George Stobbart, Jeff Taylor and goalkeeper Sonny Feehan were the only players to arrive at Griffin Park. Ageing full back Fred Monk was released, goalkeeper Alf Jefferies transferred to Torquay United and the £10,000 fee from the sale of Jimmy Bloomfield to Arsenal was spent on relieving the club's debts. The products of Alf Bew's youth team were to be given more of a chance than in the previous Second Division seasons.

Brentford drew four of the first six matches of the season and Bees slowly pulled away from the relegation places, before moving into the top 10 after three wins in a four match spell in late September 1954. An uneven period followed through to February 1955, with the club drifting slowly towards the re-election places (the £10,000 sale of forward Billy Dare to West Ham United was offset by the emergence of youth product Jim Towers), before rising back to an 11th-place finish after just three defeats in the final 18 matches of the season. Frank Dudley (20, George Stobbart (19) and Jim Towers (16) led the club's goalscoring chart, but while 82 league goals were scored, 82 were also conceded, which was amongst the highest in the Third Division South.

The FA Cup proved to be an entertaining distraction, with Brentford entering at the first round stage for the first time since the 1932–33 season. Non-league clubs Nuneaton Borough and Crook Town were beaten in the first two rounds and it took two replays to get past Bradford City in the third. The Bees fell to Newcastle United at St James' Park in the fourth round, but they gave their First Division hosts a scare with goals from George Stobbart and Johnny Rainford in the 3–2 defeat.

A number of club records were set or equalled during the season:
 Most home league goals conceded in a season: 36
 Highest away league aggregate score: 10 (4–6 versus Southampton, 21 August 1954)
 Most league games without a clean sheet: 20 (25 September 1954 – 19 February 1955)
 Quickest league goalscorer: 10 seconds – George Stobbart (versus Aldershot, 6 November 1954)[19]

League table

Results

Brentford's goal tally listed first.

Legend

Football League Third Division South

FA Cup

 Sources: 100 Years Of Brentford, Statto, 11v11

Playing squad 
Players' ages are as of the opening day of the 1954–55 season.

 Sources: 100 Years Of Brentford, Timeless Bees

Coaching staff

Statistics

Appearances and goals

Players listed in italics left the club mid-season.
Source: 100 Years Of Brentford

Goalscorers 

Players listed in italics left the club mid-season.
Source: 100 Years Of Brentford

Representative appearances

Management

Summary

Transfers & loans

Notes

References 

Brentford F.C. seasons
Brentford